The Federalist Papers is a collection of 85 articles and essays written by Alexander Hamilton, James Madison, and John Jay under the collective pseudonym "Publius" to promote the ratification of the Constitution of the United States. The collection was commonly known as The Federalist until the name The Federalist Papers emerged in the 20th century.

The first 77 of these essays were published serially in the Independent Journal, the New York Packet, and The Daily Advertiser between October 1787 and April 1788. A compilation of these 77 essays and eight others were published in two volumes as The Federalist: A Collection of Essays, Written in Favour of the New Constitution, as Agreed upon by the Federal Convention, September 17, 1787, by publishing firm J. & A. McLean in March and May 1788. The last eight papers (Nos. 78–85) were republished in the New York newspapers between June 14 and August 16, 1788.

The authors of The Federalist intended to influence the voters to ratify the Constitution. In Federalist No. 1, they explicitly set that debate in broad political terms:It has been frequently remarked, that it seems to have been reserved to the people of this country, by their conduct and example, to decide the important question, whether societies of men are really capable or not, of establishing good government from reflection and choice, or whether they are forever destined to depend, for their political constitutions, on accident and force.

In Federalist No. 10, Madison discusses the means of preventing rule by majority faction and advocates a large, commercial republic. This is complemented by Federalist No. 14, in which Madison takes the measure of the United States, declares it appropriate for an extended republic, and concludes with a memorable defense of the constitutional and political creativity of the Federal Convention.

In Federalist No. 84, Hamilton makes the case that there is no need to amend the Constitution by adding a Bill of Rights, insisting that the various provisions in the proposed Constitution protecting liberty amount to a "bill of rights." Federalist No. 78, also written by Hamilton, lays the groundwork for the doctrine of judicial review by federal courts of federal legislation or executive acts. Federalist No. 70 presents Hamilton's case for a one-man chief executive. In Federalist No. 39, Madison presents the clearest exposition of what has come to be called "Federalism".  In Federalist No. 51, Madison distills arguments for checks and balances in an essay often quoted for its justification of government as "the greatest of all reflections on human nature." According to historian Richard B. Morris, the essays that make up The Federalist Papers are an "incomparable exposition of the Constitution, a classic in political science unsurpassed in both breadth and depth by the product of any later American writer." In addition to Robert Morris, Thomas Jefferson, Founding Father and third President of the United States wrote to James Madison concerning the Federalist Papers, "I read it with care, pleasure and improvement, and was satisfied there was nothing in it by one of those hands, and not a great deal by a second. It does the highest honor to the third, as being, in my opinion, the best commentary on the principles of government, whichever was written."

On June 21, 1788, the proposed Constitution was ratified by the minimum of nine states required under Article VII. Towards the end of July 1788, with eleven states having ratified the new Constitution, the process of organizing the new government began.

History

Origins

The Federal Convention (Constitutional Convention) sent the proposed Constitution to the Confederation Congress, which in turn submitted it to the states for ratification at the end of September 1787. On September 27, 1787, "Cato" first appeared in the New York press criticizing the proposition; "Brutus" followed on October 18, 1787. These and other articles and public letters critical of the new Constitution would eventually become known as the "Anti-Federalist Papers". In response, Alexander Hamilton decided to launch a measured defense and extensive explanation of the proposed Constitution to the people of the state of New York. He wrote in Federalist No. 1 that the series would "endeavor to give a satisfactory answer to all the objections which shall have made their appearance, that may seem to have any claim to your attention."

Hamilton recruited collaborators for the project. He enlisted John Jay, who after four strong essays (Federalist Nos. 2, 3, 4, and 5), fell ill and contributed only one more essay, Federalist No. 64, to the series. Jay also distilled his case into a pamphlet in the spring of 1788, An Address to the People of the State of New-York; Hamilton cited it approvingly in Federalist No. 85. James Madison, present in New York as a Virginia delegate to the Confederation Congress, was recruited by Hamilton and Jay and became Hamilton's primary collaborator. Gouverneur Morris and William Duer were also considered. However, Morris turned down the invitation, and Hamilton rejected three essays written by Duer. Duer later wrote in support of the three Federalist authors under the name "Philo-Publius", meaning either "Friend of the People" or "Friend of Hamilton" based on Hamilton's pen name Publius.

Alexander Hamilton chose the pseudonymous name "Publius". While many other pieces representing both sides of the constitutional debate were written under Roman names, historian Albert Furtwangler contends that Publius' was a cut above 'Caesar' or 'Brutus' or even 'Cato'. Publius Valerius helped found the ancient republic of Rome. His more famous name, Publicola, meant 'friend of the people'." Hamilton had applied this pseudonym to three letters in 1778, in which he attacked fellow Federalist Samuel Chase and revealed that Chase had taken advantage of knowledge gained in Congress to try to dominate the flour market.

Authorship 

At the time of publication, the authors of The Federalist Papers attempted to hide their identities due to Hamilton and Madison having attended the convention. Astute observers, however, correctly discerned the identities of Hamilton, Madison, and Jay. Establishing authorial authenticity of the essays that constitute The Federalist Papers has not always been clear. After Alexander Hamilton died in 1804, a list emerged, claiming that he alone had written two-thirds of The Federalist essays. Some believe that several of these essays were written by James Madison (Nos. 49–58 and 62–63).  The scholarly detective work of Douglass Adair in 1944 postulated the following assignments of authorship, corroborated in 1964 by a computer analysis of the text:

 Alexander Hamilton (51 articles: Nos. 1, 6–9, 11–13, 15–17, 21–36, 59–61, and 65–85)
 James Madison (29 articles: Nos. 10, 14, 18–20, 37–58 and 62–63)
 John Jay (5 articles: Nos. 2–5 and 64).

In six months, a total of 85 articles were written by the three men. Hamilton, who had been a leading advocate of national constitutional reform throughout the 1780s and was one of the three representatives for New York at the Constitutional Convention, in 1789 became the first secretary of the treasury, a post he held until his resignation in 1795. Madison, who is now acknowledged as the father of the Constitution — despite his repeated rejection of this honor during his lifetime, became a leading member of the U.S. House of Representatives from Virginia (1789–1797), secretary of state (1801–1809), and ultimately the fourth president of the United States (1809–1817).

John Jay, who had been secretary for foreign affairs under the Articles of Confederation from 1784 through their expiration in 1789, became the first chief justice of the United States in 1789, stepping down in 1795 to accept election as governor of New York, a post he held for two terms, retiring in 1801.

Publication

The Federalist articles appeared in three New York newspapers: The Independent Journal, the New-York Packet, and the Daily Advertiser, beginning on October 27, 1787. Although written and published with haste, The Federalist articles were widely read and greatly influenced the shape of American political institutions. Hamilton, Madison and Jay published the essays at a rapid pace. At times, three to four new essays by Publius appeared in the papers in a single week. Garry Wills observes that this fast pace of production "overwhelmed" any possible response: "Who, given ample time could have answered such a battery of arguments? And no time was given." Hamilton also encouraged the reprinting of the essays in newspapers outside New York state, and indeed they were published in several other states where the ratification debate was taking place. However, they were only irregularly published outside New York, and in other parts of the country they were often overshadowed by local writers.

Because the essays were initially published in New York, most of them begin with the same salutation: "To the People of the State of New York".

The high demand for the essays led to their publication in a more permanent form. On January 1, 1788, the New York publishing firm J. & A. McLean announced that they would publish the first 36 essays as a bound volume; that volume was released on March 22, 1788, and was titled The Federalist Volume 1. New essays continued to appear in the newspapers; Federalist No. 77 was the last number to appear first in that form, on April 2. A second bound volume was released on May 28, containing Federalist Nos. 37–77 and the previously unpublished Nos. 78–85. The last eight papers (Nos. 78–85) were republished in the New York newspapers between June 14 and August 16, 1788.

A 1792 French edition ended the collective anonymity of Publius, announcing that the work had been written by "Mm. Hamilton, Maddisson e Gay, citoyens de l'État de New York". In 1802, George Hopkins published an American edition that similarly named the authors. Hopkins wished as well that "the name of the writer should be prefixed to each number," but at this point Hamilton insisted that this was not to be, and the division of the essays among the three authors remained a secret.

The first publication to divide the papers in such a way was an 1810 edition that used a list left by Hamilton to associate the authors with their numbers; this edition appeared as two volumes of the compiled "Works of Hamilton". In 1818, Jacob Gideon published a new edition with a new listing of authors, based on a list provided by Madison. The difference between Hamilton's list and Madison's formed the basis for a dispute over the authorship of a dozen of the essays.

Both Hopkins's and Gideon's editions incorporated significant edits to the text of the papers themselves, generally with the approval of the authors.  In 1863, Henry Dawson published an edition containing the original text of the papers, arguing that they should be preserved as they were written in that particular historical moment, not as edited by the authors years later.

Modern scholars generally use the text prepared by Jacob E. Cooke for his 1961 edition of The Federalist; this edition used the newspaper texts for essay numbers 1–76 and the McLean edition for essay numbers 77–85.

Disputed essays

While the authorship of 73 of The Federalist essays is fairly certain, the identities of those who wrote the twelve remaining essays are disputed by some scholars. The modern consensus is that Madison wrote essays Nos. 49–58, with Nos. 18–20 being products of a collaboration between him and Hamilton; No. 64 was by John Jay. The first open designation of which essay belonged to whom was provided by Hamilton who, in the days before his ultimately fatal gun duel with Aaron Burr, provided his lawyer with a list detailing the author of each number. This list credited Hamilton with a full 63 of the essays (three of those being jointly written with Madison), almost three-quarters of the whole, and was used as the basis for an 1810 printing that was the first to make specific attribution for the essays.

Madison did not immediately dispute Hamilton's list, but provided his own list for the 1818 Gideon edition of The Federalist. Madison claimed 29 essays for himself, and he suggested that the difference between the two lists was "owing doubtless to the hurry in which [Hamilton's] memorandum was made out." A known error in Hamilton's list—Hamilton incorrectly ascribed No. 54 to John Jay, when in fact, Jay wrote No. 64—provided some evidence for Madison's suggestion.

Statistical analysis has been undertaken on several occasions in attempts to accurately identify the author of each individual essay. After examining word choice and writing style, studies generally agree that the disputed essays were written by James Madison. However, there are notable exceptions maintaining that some of the essays which are now widely attributed to Madison were, in fact, collaborative efforts.

Influence on the ratification debates
The Federalist Papers were written to support the ratification of the Constitution, specifically in New York. Whether they succeeded in this mission is questionable. Separate ratification proceedings took place in each state, and the essays were not reliably reprinted outside of New York; furthermore, by the time the series was well underway, a number of important states had already ratified it, for instance Pennsylvania on December 12. New York held out until July 26; certainly The Federalist was more important there than anywhere else, but Furtwangler argues that it "could hardly rival other major forces in the ratification contests"—specifically, these forces included the personal influence of well-known Federalists, for instance Hamilton and Jay, and Anti-Federalists, including Governor George Clinton. Further, by the time New York came to a vote, ten states had already ratified the Constitution and it had thus already passed—only nine states had to ratify it for the new government to be established among them; the ratification by Virginia, the tenth state, placed pressure on New York to ratify. In light of that, Furtwangler observes, "New York's refusal would make that state an odd outsider."

Only 19 Federalists were elected to New York's ratification convention, compared to the Anti-Federalists' 46 delegates. While New York did indeed ratify the Constitution on July 26, the lack of public support for pro-Constitution Federalists has led historian John Kaminski to suggest that the impact of The Federalist on New York citizens was "negligible".

As for Virginia, which ratified the Constitution only at its convention on June 25, Hamilton writes in a letter to Madison that the collected edition of The Federalist had been sent to Virginia; Furtwangler presumes that it was to act as a "debater's handbook for the convention there", though he claims that this indirect influence would be a "dubious distinction". Probably of greater importance to the Virginia debate, in any case, were George Washington's support for the proposed Constitution and the presence of Madison and Edmund Randolph, the governor, at the convention arguing for ratification.

Structure and content
In Federalist No. 1, Hamilton listed six topics to be covered in the subsequent articles:

 "The utility of the UNION to your political prosperity"—covered in No. 2 through No. 14
 "The insufficiency of the present Confederation to preserve that Union"—covered in No. 15 through No. 22
 "The necessity of a government at least equally energetic with the one proposed to the attainment of this object"—covered in No. 23 through No. 36
 "The conformity of the proposed constitution to the true principles of republican government"—covered in No. 37 through No. 
 "Its analogy to your own state constitution"—covered in No. 85
 "The additional security which its adoption will afford to the preservation of that species of government, to liberty and to prosperity"—covered in No. 85.

Furtwangler notes that as the series grew, this plan was somewhat changed. The fourth topic expanded into detailed coverage of the individual articles of the Constitution and the institutions it mandated, while the two last topics were merely touched on in the last essay.

The papers can be broken down by author as well as by topic. At the start of the series, all three authors were contributing; the first 20 papers are broken down as 11 by Hamilton, five by Madison and four by Jay. The rest of the series, however, is dominated by three long segments by a single writer: Nos. 21–36 by Hamilton, Nos. 37–58 by Madison, written while Hamilton was in Albany, and No. 65 through the end by Hamilton, published after Madison had left for Virginia.

Opposition to the Bill of Rights
The Federalist Papers (specifically Federalist No. 84) are notable for their opposition to what later became the United States Bill of Rights. The idea of adding a Bill of Rights to the Constitution was originally controversial because the Constitution, as written, did not specifically enumerate or protect the rights of the people, rather it listed the powers of the government and left all that remained to the states and the people. Alexander Hamilton, the author of Federalist No. 84, feared that such an enumeration, once written down explicitly, would later be interpreted as a list of the only rights that people had.

However, Hamilton's opposition to a Bill of Rights was far from universal. Robert Yates, writing under the pseudonym "Brutus", articulated this view point in the so-called Anti-Federalist No. 84, asserting that a government unrestrained by such a bill could easily devolve into tyranny. References in The Federalist and in the ratification debates warn of demagogues of the variety who through divisive appeals would aim at tyranny. The Federalist begins and ends with this issue. In the final paper Hamilton offers "a lesson of moderation to all sincere lovers of the Union, and  ought to put them on their guard against hazarding anarchy, civil war, a perpetual alienation of the States from each other, and perhaps the military despotism of a successful demagogue". The matter was further clarified by the Ninth Amendment.

Judicial use
Federal judges, when interpreting the Constitution, frequently use The Federalist Papers as a contemporary account of the intentions of the framers and ratifiers. They have been applied on issues ranging from the power of the federal government in foreign affairs (in Hines v. Davidowitz) to the validity of ex post facto laws (in the 1798 decision Calder v. Bull, apparently the first decision to mention The Federalist). , The Federalist had been quoted 291 times in Supreme Court decisions.

The amount of deference that should be given to The Federalist Papers in constitutional interpretation has always been somewhat controversial. As early as 1819, Chief Justice John Marshall noted in the famous case McCulloch v. Maryland, that "the opinions expressed by the authors of that work have been justly supposed to be entitled to great respect in expounding the Constitution. No tribute can be paid to them which exceeds their merit; but in applying their opinions to the cases which may arise in the progress of our government, a right to judge of their correctness must be retained." In a letter to Thomas Ritchie in 1821, James Madison stated of the Constitution that "the legitimate meaning of the Instrument must be derived from the text itself; or if a key is to be sought elsewhere, it must be not in the opinions or intentions of the Body which planned & proposed the Constitution, but in the sense attached to it by the people in their respective State Conventions where it recd. all the authority which it possesses."

Complete list 
The colors used to highlight the rows correspond to the author of the paper.

In popular culture 
The purposes and authorship of The Federalist Papers were prominently highlighted in the lyrics of "Non-Stop", the finale of Act One in the 2015 Broadway musical Hamilton, written by Lin-Manuel Miranda.

See also
 American philosophy
 The Anti-Federalist Papers
 The Complete Anti-Federalist
 List of pseudonyms used in the American Constitutional debates

Citations

General and cited references 
 
  Updated 2nd ed., originally published as   
 
 Wills, Gary. Explaining America: The Federalist. Garden City, NJ: 1981.

Further reading
 
 Dietze, Gottfried. The Federalist: A Classic on Federalism and Free Government. Baltimore: The Johns Hopkins Press, 1960.
 Epstein, David F. The Political Theory of the Federalist. Chicago: The University of Chicago Press, 1984.
 
 
 Gray, Leslie, and Wynell Burroughs. "Teaching With Documents: Ratification of the Constitution". Social Education, 51 (1987): 322–24.
 
 Heriot, Gail. "Are Modern Bloggers Following in the Footsteps of Publius (and Other Musings on Blogging By Legal Scholars)", 84 Wash. U. L. Rev. 1113 (2006).
 
 Kesler, Charles R. Saving the Revolution: The Federalist Papers and the American Founding. New York: 1987.
 
 Patrick, John J., and Clair W. Keller. Lessons on the Federalist Papers: Supplements to High School Courses in American History, Government and Civics. Bloomington, IN: Organization of American Historians in association with ERIC/ChESS, 1987. ED 280 764.
 Schechter, Stephen L. Teaching about American Federal Democracy. Philadelphia: Center for the Study of Federalism at Temple University, 1984. ED 248 161.
 Scott, Kyle. The Federalist Papers: A Reader's Guide (New York: Bloomsbury Press, 2013).
 Sunstein, Cass R. "The Enlarged Republic—Then and Now", The New York Review of Books (March 26, 2009): Volume LVI, Number 5, p. 45.
 Webster, Mary E. The Federalist Papers: In Modern Language Indexed for Today's Political Issues. Bellevue, WA: Merril Press, 1999.
 White, Morton. Philosophy, The Federalist, and the Constitution. New York: 1987.
 Whitten, Roger D. (ed.). The Federalist Papers, or, How Government Is Supposed to Work, "Edited for Readability". Oakesdale, WA: Lucky Zebra Press, 2007. . .

External links

 
 "The federalist: a collection of essays"
 "Full Text of The Federalist Papers"
 The Federalist Papers, original 1788 printing

 National Archives on The Federalist
 The Federalist Papers on the Bill of Rights
 Teaching The Federalist Papers
 Booknotes interview with Robert Scigliano on Scigliano's Modern Library edition of The Federalist Papers, January 21, 2001.
 Collection of The Federalist Papers
 EDSITEment on The Federalist and Anti-Federalist debates on diversity and the extended republic
 
 

 
1787 in American law
1787 non-fiction books
1788 non-fiction books
1788 in American law
1787 essays
1788 essays
American political philosophy literature
Democracy
Essay collections
United States documents
Works published anonymously
Works published under a pseudonym